Vamanapuram  is a village in Thiruvananthapuram district in the state of Kerala, India. It is the location of Shri 'Vamana', one of the ten incarnations of Maha Vishnu. The Lord Vamana temple is located here, and hence the name Vamanapuram, meaning 'the city of the lord Vamana'.

Demographics
 India census, Vamanapuram had a population of 21,729 with 10,231 males and 11,498 females.

Geography

Vamanapuram is located at 8°41′0″N 76°56′0″E on Main Central Road, at a distance of 32 km from Thiruvananthapuram in Thiruvananthapuram District, Kerala.
The nearest airport is Thiruvananthapuram International Airport and railway station is Thiruvananthapuram Central. Kerala State Road Transport Corporation operates a bus depot at Vamanapuram. It is well connected to all parts of the state by state road transport buses. Gokulam Medical College and Muslim Association College of Engineering are located here.
Vamanapuram is located on the banks of Vamanapuram river, the longest river in Thiruvananthapuram district.
Some of the Govt.offices are now located in the buildings built by British rule.

State Government Offices
 Sub Registrar's Office, Vamanapuram
 Excise Office Vamanapuram
 Village Office Vamanapuram
 Assistant Director of Agriculture, Vamanapuram
 Krishi Bhavan, Vamanapuram
 KSEB Section Office, Vamanapuram
 Panchayath Office, Vamanapuram
 Irrigation Office, Vamanapuram
 Govt Homeo Hospital, Vamanapuram
 Govt Ayurveda Hospital, Vamanapuram
 Govt Hospital, Vamanapuram
 BSNL Telephone Exchange, Vamanapuram
 Post Office, Vamanapuram

Bank
 State Bank of India
 Co-operative Society

Vamanapuram Public market
One of the well known market for spices, vegetables and other agricultural products for a long time.
Tuesday and Friday are the market days.

Kuttoor Temple
Located in the heart of the town. Kuttoor is an Ayyappa (Sastha) temple, ruled by Travancore Devaswam Board.
Kuttor Pooram, usually celebrated end of every march, as part of Utsavam.

Muthumari Amman Mahadevasthanam 
The deity in this temple is Lord Siva and Parvathy.This is one of the oldest deity in South Kerala located in the heart of vamanapuram city.  This Temple is over 125 years old and belongs to the Vamanapuram Tamil Vishwabrahma community. Although it is a family temple of the Tamil Vishwa Brahma community, people from other communities also visit the temple and perform poojas here. Muthumariamma is the Goddess Parvati. Goddess Parvati is considered as their family deity and is worshiped along with other deities such as Lord Shiva and Balamurugan Mahaganapati and Sastav. Our belief is Muthumariamman is the symbol of sacrifice and motherhood and She will offer abundant wealth and good health to her faithful devotees.

References

Villages in Thiruvananthapuram district